Australia and Fiji have played each other a total of 22 times, of which Australia has won the most with 19. Fiji won two of the first four matches between the sides, but they have not beaten Australia since then. Their first meeting was in 1952; Australia won this match 15-9.

Summary

Overall

Records
Note: Date shown in brackets indicates when the record was or last set.

Results

Australia national rugby union team matches
Fiji national rugby union team matches